Otto Friedrich Gussmann (22 May 1869, Wachbach, Main-Tauber-Kreis - 27 July 1926, Dresden) was a German decorative artist, designer, and art professor.

Biography 

His father was a pastor. After completing secondary school, he began an apprenticeship with a decorative painter in Stuttgart. He also took classes at the Kunstgewerbeschule (now the State Academy of Fine Arts). In 1892, he moved to the teaching institute at the Kunstgewerbemuseum Berlin. Four years later, he began studying at the Berlin Academy of Fine Arts.

After completing his studies, he established his reputation with paintings and decorations for the new Reichstag, designed by Paul Wallot. In 1897, Wallot invited him to Dresden to become a teacher at the Academy of Fine Arts. The master school for decorative painting was opened under his direction in 1910. He would be named a Professor in 1915 and, four years later, he became Director of Studies; holding that position until his death. 

He was married in 1904, to Gertrud Herzog (1877-1961), and they had three children.

He taught several of their members, including Max Pechstein and Otto Dix. 

While preparing for an exhibition in 1926, he died of a heart attack. A street in the  district of Dresden has been named after him.

References

Further reading 
 Kurt Proksch: "Gussmann". Maler und Werk series, Verlag der Kunst, Dresden 1989 
 Adolf Smitmans, Anne Peters (Eds.): Otto Gussmann: 1869–1926, 1992, 
 Timo Niegsch (Ed.): Gussmann – Lange – Dix: Albstadts Dresdner Kunst, Albstadt Art Museum, 2006,

External links 

 
 Biography and references @ the Stadtwiki Dresden
 Thomas Morgenroth, "Himmelfahrt im Jugendstil", In: Sächsische Zeitung, 2017, (Online)

1869 births
1926 deaths
German artists
Decorative arts
German designers
German art educators
People from Main-Tauber-Kreis